Opus III were an English electronic music group who had success on the UK Singles and U.S. Dance charts. The group consisted of vocalist Kirsty Hawkshaw and producers/musicians Kevin Dodds, Ian Munro and Nigel Walton. The group members promoted a strong environmental and feminist message through their lyrics, album liner notes and photo and video imagery. Their biggest hit was "It's a Fine Day", which reached number five in the United Kingdom in February 1992. The song had previously been recorded by the singer Jane in 1983, and its lyrics had been taken from a song by poet Edward Barton.

Career
Prior to the forming of Opus III, Dodds, Munro, and Walton, signed with Capitol Records UK under the name A.S.K. The act released their first single “Kiss and Tell,” in 1988. Afterwards, the trio signed with MCA Records UK, where they released their next single, "Dream," in 1990, peaking at number 85 on the UK singles chart. The group later released a third single, “Freedom We Cry,” in 1991.

It was during the autumn of 1990 that they noticed a rave dancer that they would add to the act as their visual dancer and afterwards become their lead singer, Kirsty Hawkshaw. The group would eventually become Opus III in 1992. During their tenure as a group, Hawkshaw was the only member that was visible in the music videos and television performances due to the other three members still being under contract to MCA. Once they were released from the label, the other members remained in the background, with the exception of live concert shows.

Their debut album, Mind Fruit, produced the track "It's a Fine Day", a cover of a 1983 single by Jane, which topped the U.S. Hot Dance Club Play chart in 1992 and reached number five on the UK Singles Chart.

The song, now considered a house music classic, is the basis of Orbital's 1992 track "Halcyon" and its album version "Halcyon + On + On" included in their second eponymous album; the "la la la" section of the "It's a Fine Day" chorus was backmasked and sampled throughout the song. Hawkshaw appeared in the video for "Halcyon" playing a housewife who was "under the influence".

The other single release from Mind Fruit was "I Talk to the Wind", a cover of the 1969 song by King Crimson. This was not a big chart success in the UK, only reaching number 52.

Opus III's second album Guru Mother surfaced in 1994 and produced another U.S. number-one dance song "When You Made the Mountain". A third dance chart entry, "Hand in Hand (Looking for Sweet Inspiration)" hit number 14.

The group disbanded after their second album. Hawkshaw was worried the project was becoming too commercial, which is one of the reasons for the band's separation (she has ruled out a reunion as well). Hawkshaw went on to pursue a solo career, lending her vocals to a number of electronic and dance music artists and tracks into the opening years of the 21st century, including Delerium, Silent Poets, BT, DJ Tiësto and again with Orbital.

Discography

Studio albums

Singles

See also
List of number-one dance hits (United States)
List of artists who reached number one on the US Dance chart

References

External links
Opus III discography at Discogs
 

English house music groups
British trance music groups
English electronic music groups
Musical groups from London
1992 establishments in England
1994 disestablishments in England
Musical groups established in 1992
Musical groups disestablished in 1994